Rosenqvist is a Swedish surname meaning "rose branch".

Geographical distribution
As of 2014, 64.1% of all known bearers of the surname Rosenqvist were residents of Sweden (frequency 1:4,169), 22.3% of Finland (1:6,671), 9.6% of Denmark (1:15,900)  and 1.4% of Norway (1:97,025).

In Sweden, the frequency of the surname was higher than national average (1:4,169) in the following counties:
 1. Kalmar County (1:1,804)
 2. Skåne County (1:2,039)
 3. Kronoberg County (1:2,363)
 4. Jönköping County (1:2,796)
 5. Blekinge County (1:3,142)
 6. Östergötland County (1:3,392)
 7. Gävleborg County (1:3,685)
 8. Gotland County (1:3,899)

In Finland, the frequency of the surname was higher than national average (1:6,671) in the following regions:
 1. Åland (1:587)
 2. Satakunta (1:1,750)
 3. Southwest Finland (1:3,393)
 4. Uusimaa (1:4,638)
 5. Ostrobothnia (1:5,607)

People
 Edil Rosenqvist, Finnish wrestler
 Einar Rosenqvist, Norwegian naval officer and politician
 Emelie Rosenqvist (born 1980), Swedish actress
 Ernst Rosenqvist, Finnish sports shooter
 Felix Rosenqvist, Swedish racing driver
 Gustaf Allan Rosenqvist, Finnish businessman and co-founder of Andrée & Rosenqvist company
 Helena Hillar Rosenqvist, Swedish Green Party politician
 Susanne Rosenqvist, Swedish sprint canoeist
 Terkel Rosenqvist, Norwegian chemist and metallurgist

See also 
Rosenquist

References

Swedish-language surnames